The FIS Alpine World Ski Championships 1978 were held in Garmisch-Partenkirchen, Bavaria, West Germany, between 29 January and 5 February. It held competitions in alpine skiing like downhill, special slalom, giant slalom and combined. The combined was only a "paper race".

The event is the last time the championships were held here until 2011. Garmisch hosted the first Olympic alpine skiing competition (Combined event), at the 1936 games.

Men's competitions

Downhill
Sunday, 29 January
Source:

Giant Slalom
Thursday, 2 February
Source:

Slalom
Sunday, 5 February
Source:

Combined
At the World Championships from 1954 through 1980, the combined was a "paper race" using the results of the three events (DH, GS, SL).

Women's competitions

Downhill
Wednesday, 1 February
Source:

Giant Slalom
Saturday, 4 February
This was the first two-run women's giant slalom at the World Championships.
Source:

Slalom
Friday, 3 February
Source:

Combined
Source:At the World Championships from 1954 through 1980, the combined was a "paper race" using the results of the three events (DH, GS, SL).

Medals Table

References

External links
FIS-ski.com – results – 1978 World Championships – Garmisch-Partenkirchen, West Germany
FIS-ski.com – results – World Championships

FIS Alpine World Ski Championships
1978
A
1978 in German sport
Sport in Garmisch-Partenkirchen
Alpine skiing competitions in West Germany
January 1978 sports events in Europe
February 1978 sports events in Europe
Sports competitions in Bavaria